Rajib Saha (born 23 July 1984) is an Indian cricketer. He has played first-class and List A cricket for Tripura since the 2002–03 season.

References

External links
 

1984 births
Living people
Indian cricketers
Tripura cricketers
Place of birth missing (living people)